Bunan may be,

Bunan language
Salmawaih ibn Bunan